Senator Fleming may refer to:

Henry Fleming (Northern Ireland politician) (1871/1872–1956), Northern Irish Senate
Robert D. Fleming (1903–1994), Pennsylvania State Senate
William Fleming (governor) (1729–1795), Virginia State Senate
Wilmot Fleming (1916–1978), Pennsylvania State Senate